Parrott is an unincorporated community in Fayette County, in the U.S. state of Ohio.

History
A post office called Parrott was established in 1881, and remained in operation until 1931. The community has the name of one George Parrott. Parrott had 50 inhabitants in 1910.

References

Unincorporated communities in Fayette County, Ohio
Unincorporated communities in Ohio